Jacob Mitchell Bedeau (born 24 December 1999) is an English professional footballer who plays as a defender for Morecambe. Bedeau is a product of the Leyton Orient and Bury football academies, after impressing at a young age for Bury, debuting at sixteen, he was signed by Aston Villa and spent two years in their academy without making a senior appearance, before signing for Scunthorpe United.

Club career

Bury 
Bedeau was given his professional debut by caretaker-manager Chris Brass at the age of 16 in a League One tie against Millwall, in which Bury suffered a 3–2 defeat. After appearing on the Bury bench several times, Bedeau was given his next start in a 4–2 defeat against Bristol Rovers. He played a total of seven games for Bury.

Aston Villa 
On 31 January 2017, Bedeau joined Championship club Aston Villa on a two-and-a-half-year deal for a fee around the margin of £900,000. Bedeau did not make any first team appearances in competitive games for Aston Villa, but was a main stay of the Under-23 squad, with 42 appearances, excluding cup matches. In his first full season with the 23s (2017–18) they won the Premier League Cup and finished runners up in the league. In one of his last appearances, he captained the squad to a 5–1 victory over Manchester United U23s.

Scunthorpe United 
On 31 January 2019, Bedeau joined League One side Scunthorpe United. He started sparingly, making his debut in September 2019 in a 1–1 draw against Leicester City U21s, in the Football League Trophy. He started only two more games that calendar year, against Sunderland (in the Football League Trophy); and Walsall (in League Two). However, he became a regular starter by the end of the 2019–20 season and into the 2020–21 season. He scored his first professional goal in a 2–2 draw against Crewe Alexandra. He scored again in a 2–0 win against Oldham Athletic. He made a total of 53 appearances for Scunthorpe, 45 of them being in the league. He was one of 17 players released by Scunthorpe at the end of the 2020–21 season.

Burnley
Following his release from Scunthorpe he signed for Burnley on a two-year deal with the option of a further 12-months and was placed into the Under-23 squad.

Morecambe 
On 4 January 2022, Bedeau joined EFL League One side Morecambe on loan for the remainder of the 2021–22 season. He started Morecambe's next game, which was a FA Cup tie against Tottenham Hotspur. Bedeau managed to keep a clean sheet, but came off after 65 minutes. Morecambe eventually lost 3–1. On 9 August 2022, Bedeau made his loan move to Morecambe permanent for an undisclosed fee.

Career statistics

References

External links

1999 births
Living people
People from the London Borough of Waltham Forest
Association football defenders
Leyton Orient F.C. players
Bury F.C. players
Aston Villa F.C. players
Scunthorpe United F.C. players
Burnley F.C. players
Morecambe F.C. players
English Football League players
English footballers